Oybek Usmankhojaev (born 11 May December 1978) is an Uzbek former professional footballer.

Career
Usmankhojaev began his career at Sokhibkor Khalkabad. He won Uzbek League champion titles with MHSK Tashkent, Pakhtakor Tashkent and Dustlik. In 1999, he won the Uzbek League championship with Dustlik and became top scorer of the club with 22 goals. In 2000, he moved to FK Dinamo Samarqand. Dinamo Samarqand reached the final of the 2000 Uzbek Cup, but lost 4-1 in the final match to Pakhtakor Tashkent. Usmankhojaev scored the only Dinamo Samarqand goal.

From 2004 to 2008 he played for Lokomotiv Tashkent where he finished his playing career. Usmankhojaev is one of the top scoring players in Uzbek League history with 157 goals in 342 matches. He scored a total of 206 goals in all competitions, entering the Gennadi Krasnitsky club.

International
He played 11 matches and scored 1 goal for national team.

Managing career
After finishing his playing career, he started coaching in 2010 at Durmen Sport in First League as assistant coach. In November 2013 he joined Olmaliq FK coaching stuff as scout coach of the club.

Honours

Club
Navbahor Namangan
 Uzbek Cup: 1992

MHSK Tashkent
 Uzbek League: 1997
 Uzbek Cup runner-up: 1995

Pakhtakor
 Uzbek League: 1998

Dustlik
 Uzbek League: 1999

Dinamo Samarqand
 Uzbek Cup runner-up: 2000

Individual
 Gennadi Krasnitsky club: 194 goals
 Club 200 of Berador Abduraimov: 205 goals

References

External links

1972 births
Living people
Uzbekistani footballers
Buxoro FK players
FK Dinamo Samarqand players
Association football forwards
Uzbekistan international footballers